Bible Belt is the debut release by soul singer-songwriter Diane Birch. The lead single is "Nothing But a Miracle". An acoustic version of the song "Rewind" appears on a season 3 episode of The Vampire Diaries.

Development 
Birch developed her Seventies-style pop music while visiting London and Los Angeles. She recorded Bible Belt in New Orleans and her hometown New York. Several of the songs are autobiographical, such as "Don't Wait Up" which deals with sneaking out from her parents house before changing into Goth dress. "Valentino" is dedicated to her imaginary friend, her muse, from her teenage period when she felt out of time and felt ties to the 18th century. Another song, "Fire Escape", grew out of conversation with a friend, when she learned that the friend's father had recently died. The album has sounds of earlier musical times, with the feel of Joni Mitchell, Carole King, Laura Nyro, and Carly Simon threaded throughout the 13 tracks. Birch employed an orchestra of violins, violas and cellos for "Fire Escape" and "Photograph", under the direction of concert master Sandy Park. She preferred the sound of the Wurlitzer piano because it has a "richness that's hard to replicate on a modern instrument".

Reception 

In Mojo, Charles Waring described it as "a mighty impressive first album" and claimed she "combines strong vocal melodies with infectious hook lines and delivers them with a soulful fervour." He also compared her with Carole King, Laura Nyro and Phoebe Snow, while acknowledging "there are elements of gospel, doo wop, Americana and Motown ... Birch has got a great voice and the depth of feeling she injects into her performances imbues her songs with a genuine soulfulness.  Solidly consistent, the set is packed with memorable moments, including "Fools", "Nothing But a Miracle" and "Mirror Mirror"."

Track listing

Personnel 
Musicians
Diane Birch: vocals, bells, Fender Rhodes piano, Farfisa organ, finger snaps, guitar, handclapping, keyboards, organ, piano, Wurlitzer electric piano, synthesizers, percussion 
Betty Wright, Cole Williams, Sumyia Dabney, Eugene Pitt, Bobby Jay, Jose Moro, Joel Katz, Michael Longoria: additional vocals and/or doo-wop vocals
Lenny Kaye (primary), Fionn O'Lachlainn: electric guitar
Anna Wayland: acoustic guitar
Adam Blackstone, George Porter Jr.: bass guitar
Cindy Blackman: drums
Stanton Moore: drums, percussion
Raymond Angry: organ
Lou Marini, Lenny Pickett: saxophone
Tom Malone: trombone, flugelhorn
Jim Hines (primary), Frank London: trumpet
Eugene Briskin, Sumire Kudo, Jeanne LeBlanc, Eileen Moon, Sophie Shao, Mary Wooten, Wei Hong Yu: cello
Eva Burmeister, Tomas K. Carney, Minyoung Chang, Shan Jiang, Lisa Kim, Juan Cheng Lu, Karen Marx, Sarah O'Boyle, Suzanne Ornstein, Sandra Park, Annaliesa Place, Jenny Strenger, Arnaud Sussmann, Jung Sun Yoo, Alicia Svigals, Maxim Moston: violin
David Creswell, Dawn Hannay, Vivek Kamath, Daniel Panner, Michael Roth: viola
Shannon Powell: tambourine

Production
Steve Greenberg: Executive producer, producer
Betty Wright: producer
Mike Manginin: producer, mixing
Howie Beno: engineer, mixing
Steve Greenwell: engineer, mixing
Chris Gehringer: mastering
Sheldon Steiger: engineer
Tim Ives: photography

Chart positions

References

External links 
 

2009 debut albums
Diane Birch albums
S-Curve Records albums